Tommy Urhaug (born 16 June 1980 in Bergen) is a Norwegian Paralympic table tennis player. He won a bronze medal at the 2008 Summer Paralympics. At the 2012 Summer Paralympics, he won gold in men's singles class 5 table tennis.

References

External links
 Tommy Urhaug at ITTF Para Table Tennis
 
 

1980 births
Living people
Norwegian table tennis players
Table tennis players at the 2008 Summer Paralympics
Table tennis players at the 2012 Summer Paralympics
Paralympic table tennis players of Norway
Medalists at the 2008 Summer Paralympics
Medalists at the 2012 Summer Paralympics
Paralympic medalists in table tennis
Paralympic gold medalists for Norway
Paralympic bronze medalists for Norway
Sportspeople from Bergen
Table tennis players at the 2020 Summer Paralympics